Phục Hòa is a former district of Cao Bằng province in the Northeast region of Vietnam. As of 2003 the district had a population of 22,271. The district covers an area of 250 km2. The district capital lies at Hòa Thuận.

Phục Hòa District was subdivided to 9 commune-level subdivisions, including the townships of Hòa Thuận (district capital), Tà Lùng and the rural communes of: Mỹ Hưng, Hồng Đại, Cách Linh, Triệu Ẩu, Đại Sơn, Tiên Thành and Lương Thiện.

On February 11, 2020, Phục Hòa District was consolidated with Quảng Uyên district to form the new district of Quảng Hòa.

References

Former districts of Vietnam
China–Vietnam border crossings